The skin of an aircraft is the outer surface which covers much of its wings and fuselage. The most commonly used materials are aluminum and aluminium alloys with other metals, including zinc, magnesium and copper.

History
As the twentieth century progressed, aluminum became an essential metal in aircraft. The cylinder block of the engine that powered the Wright brothers’ plane at Kitty Hawk in 1903 was a one-piece casting in an aluminum alloy containing 8% copper; aluminum propeller blades appeared as early as 1907; and aluminum covers, seats, cowlings, cast brackets, and similar parts were common by the beginning of the First World War.

In 1916, L. Brequet designed a reconnaissance bomber that marked the initial use of aluminum in the working structure of an airplane. By war’s end, the Allies and Germany employed aluminum alloys for the structural framework of fuselage and wing assemblies.

Alloys for airframe components
The aircraft airframe has been the most demanding application for aluminum alloys; to chronicle the development of the high-strength alloys is also to record the development of airframes. Duralumin, the first high-strength, heat treatable aluminum alloy, was employed initially for the framework of rigid airships, by Germany and the Allies during World War I. Duralumin was an aluminum-copper-magnesium alloy; it was originated in Germany and developed in the United States as Alloy 17S-T (2017-T4). It was utilized primarily as sheet and plate.
Alloy 7075-T6 (70,000-psi yield strength), an Al-Zn-Mg-Cu alloy, was introduced in 1943. Since then, most aircraft structures have been specified in alloys of this type. The first aircraft designed in 7075-T6 was the Navy’s P2V patrol bomber. A higher-strength alloy in the same series, 7178-T6 (78,000-psi yield strength), was developed in 1951; it has not generally displaced 7075-T6, which has superior fracture toughness. 
Alloy 7178-T6 is used primarily in structural members where performance is critical under compressive loading.

Alloy 7079-T6 was introduced in the United States in 1954. In forged sections over 3 in. thick, it provides higher strength and greater transverse ductility than 7075-T6. It now is available in sheet, plate, extrusions, and forgings.

Alloy X7080-T7, with higher resistance to stress corrosion than 7079-T6, is being developed for thick parts. Because it is relatively insensitive to quenching rate, good strengths with low quenching stresses can be produced in thick sections.

Cladding of aluminum alloys was developed initially to increase the corrosion resistance of 2017-T4 sheet and thus to reduce aluminum aircraft maintenance requirements. The coating on 2017 sheet - and later on 2024-T3 - consisted of commercial-purity aluminum metallurgically bonded to one or both surfaces of the sheet.

Electrolytic protection, present under wet or moist conditions, is based on the appreciably higher electrode potential of commercial-purity aluminum compared to alloy 2017 or 2024 in the T3 or T4 temper. When 7075-T6 and other Al-Zn-Mg-Cu alloys appeared, an aluminum-zinc cladding alloy 7072 was developed to provide a relative electrode potential sufficient to protect the new strong alloys.

However, the high-performance aircraft designed since 1945 have made extensive use of skin structures machined from thick plate and extrusions, precluding the use of alclad exterior skins. Maintenance requirements increased as a result, and these stimulated research and development programs seeking higher-strength alloys with improved resistance to corrosion without cladding.

Aluminum alloy castings traditionally have been used in nonstructural airplane hardware, such as pulley brackets, quadrants, doublers, clips, ducts, and wave guides. They also have been employed extensively in complex valve bodies of hydraulic control systems. The philosophy of some aircraft manufacturers still is to specify castings only in places where failure of the part cannot cause loss of the airplane. Redundancy in cable and hydraulic control systems "permits" the use of castings.

Casting technology has made great advances in the last decade. Time-honored alloys such as 355 and 356 have been modified to produce higher levels of strength and ductility. New alloys such as 354, A356, A357, 359 and Tens 50 were developed for premium-strength castings. The high strength is accompanied by enhanced structural integrity and performance reliability.

Electric resistance spot and seam welding are used to join secondary structures, such as fairings, engine cowls, and doublers, to bulkheads and skins. Difficulties in quality control have resulted in low utilization of electric resistance welding for primary structure.

Ultrasonic welding offers some economic and quality-control advantages for production joining, particularly for thin sheet. However, the method has not yet been developed extensively in the aerospace industry.

Adhesive bonding is a common method of joining in both primary and secondary structures. Its selection is dependent on the design philosophy of the aircraft manufacturer. It has proven satisfactory in attaching stiffeners, such as hat sections to sheet, and face sheets to honeycomb cores. Also, adhesive bonding has withstood adverse exposures such as sea-water immersion and atmospheres.

Fusion welded aluminum primary structures in airplanes are virtually nonexistent, because the high-strength alloys utilized have low weldability and low weld-joint efficiencies. Some of the alloys, such as 2024-T4, also have their corrosion resistance lowered in the heat-affected zone if left in the as-welded condition.

The improved welding processes and higher-strength weldable alloys developed during the past decade offer new possibilities for welded primary structures. For example, the weldability and strength of alloys 2219 and 7039, and the brazeability and strength of X7005, open new avenues for design and manufacture of aircraft structures.

Light aircraft
Light aircraft have airframes primarily of all-aluminum semi-monocoque construction, however, a few light planes have tubular truss load-carrying construction with fabric or aluminum skin, or both.
Aluminum skin is normally of the minimum practical thickness: 0.015 to 0.025 in. Although design strength requirements are relatively low, the skin needs moderately high yield strength and hardness to minimize ground damage from stones, debris, mechanics’ tools, and general handling. Other primary factors involved in selecting an alloy for this application are corrosion resistance, cost, and appearance. Alloys 6061-T6 and alclad 2024-T3 are the primary choices.

Skin sheet on light airplanes of recent design and construction generally is alclad 2024-T3. The internal structure comprises stringers, spars, bulkheads, chord members, and various attaching fittings made of aluminum extrusions, formed sheet, forgings, and castings.

The alloys most used for extruded members are 2024-T4 for sections less than 0.125 in. thick and for general application, and 2014-T6 for thicker, more highly stressed sections. Alloy 6061-T6 has considerable application for extrusions requiring thin sections and excellent corrosion resistance. Alloy 2014-T6 is the primary forging alloy, especially for landing gear and hydraulic cylinders. Alloy 6061-T6 and its forging counterpart 6151-T6 often are utilized in miscellaneous fittings for reasons of economy and increased corrosion performance, when the parts are not highly stressed.

Alloys 356-T6 and A356-T6 are the primary casting alloys employed for brackets, bellcranks, pulleys, and various fittings. Wheels are produced in these alloys as permanent mold or sand castings. Die castings in alloy A380 also are satisfactory for wheels for light aircraft.

For low-stressed structure in light aircraft, alloys 3003-H12, H14, and H16; 5052-O, H32, H34, and H36; and 6061-T4 and T6 are sometimes employed. These alloys are also primary selections for fuel, lubricating oil, and hydraulic oil tanks, piping, and instrument tubing and brackets, especially where welding is required. Alloys 3003, 6061, and 6951 are utilized extensively in brazed heat exchangers and hydraulic accessories. Recently developed alloys, such as 5086, 5454, 5456, 6070, and the new weldable aluminum-magnesium-zinc alloys, offer strength advantages over those previously mentioned.

Sheet assembly of light aircraft is accomplished predominantly with rivets of alloys 2017-T4, 2117-T4, or 2024-T4. Self-tapping sheet metal screws are available in aluminum alloys, but cadmium-plated steel screws are employed more commonly to obtain higher shear strength and driveability. Alloy 2024-T4 with an anodic coating is standard for aluminum screws, bolts, and nuts made to military specifications. Alloy 6262-T9, however, is superior for nuts, because of its virtual immunity to stress-corrosion cracking.

References

Aircraft components